The Bălășița is a right tributary of the river Geamărtălui in Romania. It discharges into the Geamărtălui in the town Balș.

References

Rivers of Romania
Rivers of Olt County
Rivers of Dolj County